The European Board of Urology (EBU) is the professional urological (genito-urinary surgery) regulation authority in Europe, with head offices at Arnhem, The Netherlands. The objectives are threefold: setting standards for the training of urologists in Europe, providing accreditation of CME/CPD, and offering assessments and exams. 

It awards the designation of Fellow of the European Board of Urology (FEBU) after rigorous examinations.  Part 1 is a written examination and part 2 an oral one.

External links 
 European Board of Urology

Urology organizations
European medical and health organizations